Gordon L. Anderson is an American philosopher publishing executive  and the author of Philosophy of the United States and Secretary General of Professors World Peace Academy. He is a graduate of Claremont Graduate University, where he earned a doctorate in philosophy of religion in 1986.

He is Senior Editor and Business Manager for the New World Encyclopedia since 2004, an Internet encyclopedia of some thousands articles concerning the New Age Korean ecumenical Unification Movement.

See also
American philosophy
List of American philosophers

References

20th-century American philosophers
Living people
Year of birth missing (living people)